This name uses Portuguese naming customs. the first or maternal family name is Serifo and the second or paternal family name is Nhamadjo.

Manuel Serifo Nhamadjo (25 March 1958 – 17 March 2020) was a Bissau-Guinean politician who served as president of the National People's Assembly of Guinea-Bissau. He was a candidate in the abortive 2012 presidential election, placing third in the first round. Following an April 2012 military coup, he was designated as acting president as part of a transitional arrangement.

References

|-

|-

1958 births
African Party for the Independence of Guinea and Cape Verde politicians
2020 deaths
Presidents of Guinea-Bissau
Presidents of the National People's Assembly (Guinea-Bissau)